"Epigrus" insularis is a species of sea snail, a marine gastropod mollusk in the family Pyramidellidae, the pyrams and their allies. The species is thought not to belong to the genus Epigrus, but is of uncertain placement in the family Pyramidellidae.

References

Pyramidellidae
Enigmatic animal taxa
Gastropods described in 1915